Olivia (stylized as OLIVIΛ) is the debut EP by American singer and actress Olivia Holt. It was released on July 15, 2016 through Hollywood Records following the release of her debut single "Phoenix".

Track listing

Charts

References

2016 debut EPs
Olivia Holt albums
Hollywood Records EPs